The 2010–11 season was Swansea City's 82nd season in the Football League. They finished in 3rd place, and won the Championship playoff, to win promotion to the Premier League.
It was their first return to top-flight football since 1983.

The season was their third consecutive season in the second tier following a 7th-placed finish in the previous campaign, narrowly missing out on a play-off place.

During pre-season, Paulo Sousa left the club by mutual consent, and then later succeeded Nigel Pearson as the new Leicester City manager on 7 July. Brendan Rodgers was appointed as the new manager of Swansea on 16 July, on a 12-month rolling contract.

Players

Squad information

Transfers in / out

In

Out

Loans in / out

In

Out

Squad statistics

No longer at the club

Scorers

All

League

FA Cup

League Cup

Championship stats

League table

Results summary

Results by round

Results

Pre-season friendlies

Football League Championship

Play-offs

Semi-finals

Final

FA Cup

League Cup

Footnotes
 Fee could rise to £1M depending on Sinclair's future success at the club.
 Britton had two spells with the club previously, making 295 appearances and scoring ten goals.

References

2010-11
2010–11 Football League Championship by team
Welsh football clubs 2010–11 season